Entäs nyt, Niskavuori? is a Finnish play. It was written by Hella Wuolijoki and produced in 1953.

Plays by Hella Wuolijoki
1953 plays